Robert Prescott (born 1957) is an American actor who has appeared in film and on television. He is best known for his role as Kent in the 1985 hit comedy film Real Genius. He also starred in the 1984 comedy film Bachelor Party as Cole Whittier, and appeared in the 1987 Mel Brooks hit comedy Spaceballs in a cameo as the Sand Cruiser Driver.

He starred in the Father Dowling Mysteries TV movie Fatal Confession: A Father Dowling Mystery, and has made guest appearances on TV shows including Hill Street Blues, The Sopranos, Law & Order, and Law & Order: Special Victims Unit.

Filmography

External links

Living people
American male film actors
Place of birth missing (living people)
American male television actors
University of Pennsylvania alumni
1957 births